Leucopogon carinatus is a species of flowering plant in the heath family Ericaceae and is endemic to the south-west of Western Australia. The flowers are borne on short, dense spikes on the ends of branches or in upper leaf axils with small bracts and bracteoles about half as long as the sepals. Flowering mainly occurs from July to December.

It was first formally described in 1810 by Robert Brown in his Prodromus Florae Novae Hollandiae. The specific epithet (carinatus) means "keeled", referring to the leaves.

This leucopogon grows in sandplains and on rocky slopes in the Esperance Plains, Jarrah Forest and Mallee bioregions of south-western Western Australia and is listed as "not threatened" by the Western Australian Government Department of Biodiversity, Conservation and Attractions.

References

capitellatus
Ericales of Australia
Flora of Western Australia
Plants described in 1810
Taxa named by Robert Brown (botanist, born 1773)